David Woodfield (born 11 October 1943) is an English former footballer who played in the Football League for Watford and Wolverhampton Wanderers.

Career
After a nine-year spell with Wolverhampton Wanderers where he made over 250 appearances Woodfield played for Watford before deciding to do coaching and education work in Asia. He lived and worked in Qatar, Saudi Arabia, Kuwait, Bahrain, Brunei and spent 11 years in Malaysia before returning to England in 2011.

References

External links
 

English footballers
English Football League players
1943 births
Living people
Wolverhampton Wanderers F.C. players
Watford F.C. players
Association football defenders
Sabah F.C. (Malaysia) managers